Stefan Karadzhovo is a village in Yambol Province, south Bulgaria.

Geography 
Stefan Karadzhovo is located at 40 km from Yambol, 11 km away from Bolyarovo and 65 km from Burgas. The village is situate on the skate of the Strandzha mountain.

History 
One of the legends for the village is that it was founded by farmers near to Krastavyat kladenets (mangy well). The old name of the village was Ichme. In 1763 was built the Orthodox church "Uspenie bogorodichno", which is among the oldest churches in Yambol Province.

Cultural and natural attractions 
 House of Stefan Karadzha

Personalities 
 Stefan Karadzha (1840-1868) - Bulgarian revolutionary

Honours
Stefan Karadzha Peak on Graham Land, Antarctica is named after the village.

Villages in Yambol Province